Linda Jayne Copple Trout (born September 1, 1951) is an American lawyer and retired judge from Idaho. She is a former chief justice of the Idaho Supreme Court, the only  female to hold that position.  Appointed by Governor Cecil Andrus as an associate justice in 1992, she was the first of four women to serve on the court.

Born in Tokyo, Japan, Trout was adopted by a Boise pediatrician, Dr. B.I. "Bing" Copple, and graduated from Boise High School in 1969. She attended the University of Idaho in Moscow, and was a member of Pi Beta Phi sorority. Trout earned a bachelor's degree  in 1973, and a J.D. from the UI College of Law in 1977.

Trout passed the bar in Idaho in 1977 and was in private practice in Lewiston for  She was appointed a county magistrate judge in 1983 and was elected in 1990 as a state judge in the second district, based in Lewiston.

Trout was appointed to the state's supreme court in 1992 and took office on her 41st birthday. She retained her seat in statewide elections in 1996 (unopposed) and 2002. Trout became the chief justice in February 1997, elected unanimously by the other justices, and served two terms in that capacity, over seven years. She was on the state's highest court for fifteen years and retired with over a year left in her term in August 2007, succeeded by 

She is married to attorney Kim J. Trout (B.S. 1976, J.D. 1979,

See also
List of female state supreme court justices

References

External links
Archived Idaho Supreme Court Bio

1951 births
Living people
20th-century American women lawyers
20th-century American lawyers
21st-century American judges
Chief Justices of the Idaho Supreme Court
Justices of the Idaho Supreme Court
People from Boise, Idaho
People from Tokyo
University of Idaho alumni
University of Idaho College of Law alumni
Women chief justices of state supreme courts in the United States
20th-century American women judges
20th-century American judges
21st-century American women judges